Alvin Christian Eurich (June 14, 1902 – May 27, 1987) was a 20th-century American educator who is most notable for having served as the first president of the State University of New York from 1949–1951.

Early life and education
Eurich was born in Bay City, Michigan and pursued degrees in Psychology at North Central College and the University of Maine.  He supported himself by working as a speech instructor while in Maine.  He earned a Ph.D. in Educational Psychology at the University of Minnesota in 1929, where he worked as a professor and assistant dean of the College of Education from 1927 to 1936.

Career
In 1937 he left for Northwestern University and a year after that, he left for Stanford University.  During World War II, he served in the Navy, returning to take a Vice Presidency at Stanford University.  He helped organize the Stanford Research Institute and served as its chairman. He was named acting President of Stanford in 1948 after his predecessor's sudden death, shortly before assuming the Presidency of SUNY.

From 1958 to 1964, Eurich served as Executive Director of the Ford Foundation's Educational Division and in 1961 he co-founded the Academy for Educational Development and served as its chairman for many years.  He also served as President of the Aspen Institute for Humanistic Studies from 1963 to 1972.

Personal life
He was married to Nell Eurich; they had two children: Juliet Eurich McDonough and Donald Eurich. After his death, his wife married Maurice Lazarus.

References

External links 

 Alvin Christian Eurich: An Oral History, Stanford Historical Society Oral History Program, 1980.

1902 births
1987 deaths
20th-century American psychologists
Northwestern University faculty
People from Bay City, Michigan
Presidents of Stanford University
Chancellors of the State University of New York
University of Maine alumni
North Central College alumni
University of Minnesota College of Education and Human Development alumni
University of Minnesota faculty
SRI International people
20th-century American academics